Eriogonum luteolum is a species of wild buckwheat known by the common name goldencarpet buckwheat. It is native to many of the mountain ranges of California and southern Oregon, including the Sierra Nevada, Cascades and California Coast Ranges. It grows in mountain and foothill habitat, such as forest and woodland, on granite and sometimes serpentine soils.

Description
This is an annual herb varying in size and form from erect to 60 centimeters tall to prostrate and spreading in a mat. The woolly leaves are rounded and petioled and are mostly located around the base of the plant, but sometimes appear higher on the stem.

The branches of the flowering stem bear many small clusters of white to bright pink or yellow flowers, each just a few millimeters long.

External links
Jepson Manual Treatment - Eriogonum luteolum
Eriogonum luteolum - UC Photos gallery

luteolum
Flora of California
Flora of Oregon
Flora of the Cascade Range
Flora of the Klamath Mountains
Flora of the Sierra Nevada (United States)
Natural history of the California chaparral and woodlands
Natural history of the California Coast Ranges
Flora without expected TNC conservation status